Vice Admiral Sir Richard Michael Smeeton,  (24 September 1912 – 29 March 1992) was a Royal Navy officer who served as Deputy Supreme Allied Commander Atlantic from 1962 to 1964.

Naval career
Educated at the Royal Naval College, Dartmouth, Smeeton joined the Royal Navy in 1926. He served in World War II with 804 Naval Air Squadron taking part in the Norwegian Campaign. He continued his war service as Officer Commanding 800 Naval Air Squadron from June 1940, as assistant naval attaché in Washington D. C. from May 1941 and as Air Plans Officer to the Commander-in-Chief, Pacific Fleet from 1943. He was appointed Captain of the aircraft carrier HMS Albion in 1955, Director of Plans at the Admiralty in 1956 and Flag Officer, Aircraft Carriers in 1960. He went on to be Deputy Supreme Allied Commander Atlantic in 1962 and retired in 1965.

In retirement he became Chief Executive of the Society of British Aircraft Constructors and Deputy Lieutenant of Surrey.

References

1912 births
1992 deaths
Knights Commander of the Order of the Bath
Members of the Order of the British Empire
Royal Navy vice admirals
Royal Navy officers of World War II
Deputy Lieutenants of Surrey
People from Halifax, West Yorkshire
Military personnel from Yorkshire